The North Carolina A&T Aggies women's basketball team represents North Carolina A&T State University in Greensboro, North Carolina, United States.  The team currently competes in the Colonial Athletic Association.

Postseason results

NCAA appearances
North Carolina A&T has appeared in the NCAA Division I women's basketball tournament five times. The Aggies have a record of 0–5.

WNIT appearances
The Aggies have a 2–4 record in the Women's National Invitation Tournament.

References

External links